Tyrwhitt-Drake is an English surname. Notable people with the surname include:
Bill Tyrwhitt-Drake (1926–2008), English cricketer
Edward Tyrwhitt Drake (1832–1904), English clergyman and cricketer
Garrard Tyrwhitt-Drake (1881–1964), English businessman, zoo owner and author
Montague Tyrwhitt-Drake (1830–1908), English-born lawyer, judge and political figure in Canada
Thomas Drake Tyrwhitt-Drake (1749–1810), British Member of Parliament 
Thomas Tyrwhitt-Drake (1783–1852), British Member of Parliament 
Charles Francis Tyrwhitt-Drake (1846–1874), explorer, naturalist, archaeologist, and linguist who died during the PEF Survey of Palestine

Others
Francis Tyrwhitt Drake Wilson (1876–1964), British cricketer
Tyrwhitt-Drake Museum of Carriages in Tithe Barn, Maidstone

See also
Tyrwhitt (surname)
Drake (surname)

Compound surnames
English-language surnames
Surnames of English origin